Daneshvar is an Iranian surname. Notable people with the surname include:

Daniel Daneshvar (born 1983), American neuroscientist
Fatemeh Daneshvar (born 1975), Iranian businesswoman and politician
Masoud Daneshvar (born 1988), Iranian futsal player
Mohammad Daneshvar (born 1993), Iranian cyclist
Nazanin Daneshvar (born 1983), Iranian entrepreneur
Simin Daneshvar (1921–2012), Iranian writer and translator

Persian-language surnames